Samantha Allen may refer to:

People
Sammantha Allen, convicted in the murder of Ame Deal
Samantha Allen (dancer) in Les Noces (Robbins)
Samantha Allen, played in 2005 Florida Gators softball team
Samantha Leigh Allen, writer

Fictional characters
Samantha Allen, fictional character in books by Marietta Holley
Samantha Allen, fictional character in Criminal Minds played by Hedy Burress

See also
Sam Allen (disambiguation)